Hugh Graham may refer to:

Hugh Graham, 1st Baron Atholstan (1848–1938), Canadian publisher
Hugh Graham (figure skater), American figure skater
Hugh Davis Graham (1936–2002), American historian and sociologist
Hugh Graham (equestrian), Canadian show jumper
Hugh Graham (politician), Jamaican politician

See also
Hugh Mackay (footballer) (Hugh Graham Mackay, 1867–?), English footballer